Kim Wurzel (born September 18, 1976) is a former synchronized swimmer from the United States. 

Kim competed in the women's team event at the 2000 Summer Olympics, finishing in fifth place. 

Wurzel retired from the pool in 2001 to start a career as a swimming coach, and in 2012 she was named the United States Synchronized Swimming Coach of the Year. In 2013, she quit her job to become a real estate agent.

References 

1976 births
Living people
American synchronized swimmers
Olympic synchronized swimmers of the United States
Synchronized swimmers at the 2000 Summer Olympics
World Aquatics Championships medalists in synchronised swimming